Andrija Delibašić (Serbian Cyrillic: Андрија Делибашић, ; born 24 April 1981) is a Montenegrin retired professional footballer who played as a striker.

After starting out at Partizan he went on to spend most of his career in Spain, representing Mallorca, Real Sociedad, Hércules and Rayo Vallecano and amassing totals of 208 matches and 47 goals the two major levels combined. He also competed professionally in Portugal and Greece.

Club career
Born in Nikšić, SR Montenegro, SFR Yugoslavia, Delibašić started his professional career at FK Partizan, where he played for three-and-a-half seasons collecting 126 official appearances and scoring 63 goals. With Partizan Delibašić played Champions League in season 2003–04 group stages scoring all three goals, he scored an equalizing goal against Porto on 16 September 2003 in a 1–1 home draw in the first match of group stage. Delibašić scored again on 26 November 2003 in a return match against FC Porto in a 2–1 defeat. He scored his third goal in a 1–1 home draw against Olympique Marseille in the last group stage match. In January 2004 he transferred to RCD Mallorca, never establishing himself in the first team, his best output occurring in his first season with four goals in 17 matches; in early 2005 he started a spell with S.L. Benfica, that proved to be short and unsuccessful as he saw only a few minutes of action.

For 2005–06, Delibašić was loaned again, still to a Portuguese Primeira Liga club, S.C. Braga. The following campaign, two more loan spells befell: starting off at AEK Athens F.C. in January 2007 he was released and returned to Portugal, appearing for lowly S.C. Beira-Mar; his first match for the latter was against U.D. Leiria on 4 February.

In the 2007 pre-season, Delibašić came back to Mallorca and had some solid performances, scoring six goals in two matches – that was not enough to remain with the team, however, as they loaned him out again, this time to Real Sociedad of the Spanish second division. He was definitely released on 5 August 2008, joining Hércules CF (also second level) on a free transfer and penning a two-year contract.

After two seasons as first-choice with the Alicante team, achieving top flight promotion in 2010, Delibašić moved to another side in the second tier, Rayo Vallecano. He contributed with seven goals in 30 games, as the Madrilenians also reached the top flight.

In the following two years, Delibašić was used mainly as a substitute by Rayo, scoring a combined seven times as they managed to consecutively retain their league status. He left in June 2013.

On 13 February 2014, aged nearly 33, Delibašić joined Thai League 1 side Ratchaburi Mitr Phol FC.

International career
Delibašić played for the Serbia and Montenegro under-21 team that finished runners-up at the 2004 UEFA European Under-21 Championship in Germany. A couple of months later, he was also part of the Olympic team that exited in the first round.

After a loss of form dropped him from international play, Delibašić's chances for a callup increased in mid-2006 as Montenegro separated from Serbia and became an independent country, with him now eligible to play for the newly formed national team due to his birthplace. However, even before Montenegro's inaugural match squad was announced, he voiced his dissatisfaction in the press about not being contacted by Montenegrin football officials at all and then said that he would never play for the national team in the future, if he was not included on the list of inaugural callups.

In September 2009, Delibašić was summoned for Montenegro's match with Bulgaria, but did not play in the 1–4 defeat on the 5th. He finally made his debut on 10 October, scoring the 2–1 winner against Georgia; both matches were 2010 FIFA World Cup qualifiers.

Delibašić scored his second goal for the national team on 7 October 2011, a dramatic 2–2 home draw against England that led Montenegro to the UEFA Euro 2012 playoffs. He helped the hosts come from behind 0–2 with his last-minute header. He has earned a total of 21 caps, scoring 6 goals. His final international was a June 2013 FIFA World Cup qualification match against Ukraine in Podgorcia.

International goals

Honours
Partizan
First League of Serbia and Montenegro: 2001–02, 2002–03
Serbia and Montenegro Cup: 2000–01

Benfica
Primeira Liga: 2004–05
Taça de Portugal: Runner-up 2004–05

References

External links

1981 births
Living people
Footballers from Nikšić
Association football forwards
Serbia and Montenegro footballers
Serbia and Montenegro under-21 international footballers
Olympic footballers of Serbia and Montenegro
Footballers at the 2004 Summer Olympics
Montenegrin footballers
Montenegro international footballers
FK Partizan players
RCD Mallorca players
S.L. Benfica footballers
S.C. Braga players
AEK Athens F.C. players
S.C. Beira-Mar players
Real Sociedad footballers
Hércules CF players
Rayo Vallecano players
Andrija Delibasic
FK Sutjeska Nikšić players
First League of Serbia and Montenegro players
La Liga players
Primeira Liga players
Super League Greece players
Segunda División players
Andrija Delibasic
Montenegrin First League players
Serbia and Montenegro expatriate footballers
Expatriate footballers in Spain
Serbia and Montenegro expatriate sportspeople in Spain
Expatriate footballers in Portugal
Montenegrin expatriate footballers
Expatriate footballers in Greece
Montenegrin expatriate sportspeople in Greece
Montenegrin expatriate sportspeople in Spain
Montenegrin expatriate sportspeople in Portugal
Expatriate footballers in Thailand
Montenegrin expatriate sportspeople in Thailand
FK Partizan non-playing staff